Doosan Encyclopedia is a Korean language encyclopedia published by Doosan Donga (두산동아). The encyclopedia is based on the Dong-A Color Encyclopedia (동아원색세계대백과사전), which comprises 30 volumes and began to be published in 1982 by Dong-A Publishing (동아출판사). Dong-A Publishing was merged into Doosan Donga, a subsidiary of Doosan Group, in February 1985. The Doosan Encyclopedia is a major encyclopedia in South Korea.

Digital edition

EnCyber
The online version of the Doosan Encyclopedia was named EnCyber, which is a blend of two English words: Encyclopedia and Cyber. The company has stated that, with the trademark, it aims to become a center of living knowledge. EnCyber provides free content to readers via South Korean portals such as Naver. Naver has risen to the top position in the search engine market of South Korea partially because of the popularity of EnCyber encyclopedia. When Naver exclusively contracted Doosan Doonga in 2003, the former paid multi billion won to the latter in royalties.

The articles in the EnCyber encyclopedia aim to educate readers in every age group. It is regarded as a major encyclopedia in South Korea. , EnCyber was the biggest online encyclopedia of South Korea.

Doopedia 
On November 1, 2010, the digital version of Doosan Encyclopedia was renamed 'doopedia', a portmanteau from the company name 'Doosan' and the English word 'encyclopedia'. On 7 November 2013 were 463,953 items in the 'doopedia' available. In the Korean Wikipedia on that day there were 252,830 articles.

See also
Encyclopedia of Korean Culture
List of digital library projects
List of encyclopedias by language
List of online encyclopedias
Lists of encyclopedias

References

External links

Korean encyclopedias
South Korean online encyclopedias
Doosan Group
1982 non-fiction books
20th-century encyclopedias
21st-century encyclopedias